Bream Bay is an embayment and area south-east of Whangārei, on the east coast of New Zealand. The bay runs from Bream Head, at the mouth of Whangārei Harbour, 22 kilometres south to the headland of Bream Tail, east of Langs Beach and north of Mangawhai. It was named by Captain James Cook. The Bream Bay area includes the towns of Ruakākā, One Tree Point and Waipu. A group of nature reserve islands lie outside Bream Bay: the Hen and Chicken Islands and Sail Rock.

Geography

Naming
Bream Bay was named by Captain James Cook after noticing that the bay's waters were populated with a vast number of bream, although it is now thought he was mistaken with snapper. He also named, in the same vein, Bream Head and Bream Tail at the northern and southern ends of the bay.

Districts

Ruakākā
Ruakākā area is made up of Ruakākā Beach, Ruakākā Township and Marsden Point. Ruakākā has seen development due to its proximity to the expansion of the country's only oil refinery at Marsden Point during the 1980s. A timber processing plant at Marsden Point has further stimulated growth.

One Tree Point
One Tree Point, once considered part of Ruakākā, has peeled away from the Ruakākā township as it begins to grow. Along with its off-spring area of Takahiwai, they are positioned along Whangārei Harbour. One Tree Point is a fast-growing community catering to the lifestyle blocks of the northern Bream Bay area. One Tree Point is made up of One Tree Point, Marsden Cove, Takahiwai and the eastern blocks of Marsden Point. Access is by the Port Marsden road via Ruakaka or by marine access.

Waipu
Waipu is the south-most and largest township. It features a variety of attractions ranging from surf beaches, caves, waterfalls to memorable dining. Waipu is fast gaining international immigrants and is seen to be Bream Bay's only chance at a kept rural community, with the socioeconomic growth been delivered by Ruakaka and One Tree Point. Access is gained from State Highway 1 or through back roads from Maungaturoto or Wellsford.

Waipu is situated up the river from the coast, at the last navigable place for larger boats.  The Waipu Boat Club is now situated at the place where boats used to unload when the coast and river were the main transport links.  However it has strong coastal links with Waipu Cove 8 km away and Uretiti Beach 5 km away.  Settled by Highland Scots immigrants under the charismatic Rev Norman McLeod in the 1850s, it still has a strong Scottish tradition with its own pipe band, and the Waipu Museum telling the story of the migration.

Islands
The Hen & Chicken Islands and Sail Rock are nature reserve islands just off the coast of Bream Bay. They have no human inhabitants.

Demographics

Bream Bay had a population of 2,073 at the 2018 New Zealand census, an increase of 432 people (26.3%) since the 2013 census, and an increase of 579 people (38.8%) since the 2006 census. There were 738 households, comprising 1,080 males and 990 females, giving a sex ratio of 1.09 males per female. The median age was 44.8 years (compared with 37.4 years nationally), with 441 people (21.3%) aged under 15 years, 294 (14.2%) aged 15 to 29, 996 (48.0%) aged 30 to 64, and 342 (16.5%) aged 65 or older.

Ethnicities were 87.6% European/Pākehā, 21.3% Māori, 3.0% Pacific peoples, 2.5% Asian, and 1.7% other ethnicities. People may identify with more than one ethnicity.

The percentage of people born overseas was 13.9, compared with 27.1% nationally.

Although some people chose not to answer the census's question about religious affiliation, 60.6% had no religion, 27.8% were Christian, 1.0% had Māori religious beliefs, 0.3% were Hindu, 0.1% were Muslim, 0.4% were Buddhist and 1.4% had other religions.

Of those at least 15 years old, 267 (16.4%) people had a bachelor's or higher degree, and 315 (19.3%) people had no formal qualifications. The median income was $30,300, compared with $31,800 nationally. 264 people (16.2%) earned over $70,000 compared to 17.2% nationally. The employment status of those at least 15 was that 768 (47.1%) people were employed full-time, 279 (17.1%) were part-time, and 57 (3.5%) were unemployed.

Climate
The region has warm humid summers and mild winters. Typical summer temperatures range from 22 °C to 26 °C (72 °F to 79 °F). Ground frosts are virtually unknown. The hottest months are January and February. Typical annual rainfall for the region is 1500–2000 mm. Winds year-round are predominantly from the southwest.

Education
Schools are Bream Bay College (in Ruakākā), Ruakaka School, One Tree Point School and Waipu Primary School.

References

External links
 

Whangarei District
Bays of the Northland Region